Laothoe habeli is a moth of the family Sphingidae found in China. In Shaanxi, it is found at elevations between 1,500 and 1,900 meters; in Sichuan it is found up to 2,400 meters.

The wingspan is 60–74 mm. There is one generation per year with adults on wing from May to June or July.

References

Laothoe (moth)
Moths described in 2010

de:Hyles sammuti